Acanthaceae is a family of dicotyledonous flowering plants in the order Lamiales.  The acanthus family includes almost 250 genera and about 2500 species. Most are tropical herbs, shrubs, or twining vines; some are epiphytes. Only a few species are distributed in temperate regions. The four main centres of distribution are Indonesia and Malaysia, Africa, Brazil, and Central America. Representatives of the family can be found in nearly every habitat, including dense or open forests, scrublands, wet fields and valleys, sea coast and marine areas, swamps, and mangrove forests.

23,420 species of vascular plant have been recorded in South Africa, making it the sixth most species-rich country in the world and the most species-rich country on the African continent. Of these, 153 species are considered to be threatened. Nine biomes have been described in South Africa: Fynbos, Succulent Karoo, desert, Nama Karoo, grassland, savanna, Albany thickets, the Indian Ocean coastal belt, and forests.

The 2018 South African National Biodiversity Institute's National Biodiversity Assessment plant checklist lists 35,130 taxa in the phyla Anthocerotophyta (hornworts (6)), Anthophyta (flowering plants (33534)), Bryophyta (mosses (685)), Cycadophyta (cycads (42)), Lycopodiophyta (Lycophytes(45)), Marchantiophyta (liverworts (376)), Pinophyta (conifers (33)), and Pteridophyta (cryptogams (408)).

66 genera are represented in the literature. Listed taxa include species, subspecies, varieties, and forms as recorded, some of which have subsequently been allocated to other taxa as synonyms, in which cases the accepted taxon is appended to the listing. Multiple entries under alternative names reflect taxonomic revision over time.

Acanthodium 
Genus Acanthodium:
 Acanthodium angustum Nees, accepted as Blepharis angusta (Nees) T.Anderson, indigenous
 Acanthodium capense (L.f.) Nees, accepted as Blepharis capensis (L.f.) Pers. indigenous
 Acanthodium capense (L.f.) Nees var. a Nees, accepted as Blepharis capensis (L.f.) Pers. 
 Acanthodium capense (L.f.) Nees var. b Nees, accepted as Blepharis capensis (L.f.) Pers. 
 Acanthodium capense (L.f.) Nees var. inermis Nees, accepted as Blepharis inermis (Nees) C.B.Clarke 
 Acanthodium capense (L.f.) Nees var. integrifolium Nees, accepted as Blepharis capensis (L.f.) Pers. indigenous
 Acanthodium capense (L.f.) Nees var. leucographum Nees, accepted as Blepharis capensis (L.f.) Pers. indigenous
 Acanthodium capense (L.f.) Nees var. villosum Nees, accepted as Blepharis mitrata C.B.Clarke 
 Acanthodium capense (L.f.) Nees var. villosum Nees, accepted as Blepharis capensis (L.f.) Pers. indigenous
 Acanthodium carduifolium (L.f.) Nees, accepted as Acanthopsis carduifolia (L.f.) Schinz, indigenous
 Acanthodium dipsaceum E.Mey. accepted as Acanthopsis disperma Nees 
 Acanthodium dispermum E.Mey. accepted as Acanthopsis disperma Nees 
 Acanthodium diversispinum Nees, accepted as Blepharis diversispina (Nees) C.B.Clarke 
 Acanthodium diversispinum Nees var. a Nees, accepted as Blepharis serrulata (Nees) Ficalho & Hiern 
 Acanthodium glabrum Nees, accepted as Acanthopsis glabra (Nees) H.M.Steyn, indigenous
 Acanthodium glaucum E.Mey. ex Nees, accepted as Acanthopsis glauca (E.Mey. ex Nees) Schinz, indigenous
 Acanthodium grossum Nees, accepted as Blepharis grossa (Nees) T.Anderson, indigenous
 Acanthodium hirtinervium Nees, accepted as Blepharis hirtinervia (Nees) T.Anderson, indigenous
 Acanthodium hoffmannseggianum Nees, accepted as Acanthopsis hoffmannseggiana (Nees) C.B.Clarke, indigenous
 Acanthodium macrum Nees, accepted as Blepharis macra (Nees) Vollesen 
 Acanthodium marginatum Nees, accepted as Blepharis marginata (Nees) C.B.Clarke 
 Acanthodium plumolosum E.Mey. ex Nees, accepted as Acanthopsis horrida (Nees) Nees, indigenous
 Acanthodium plumosum E.Mey. accepted as Acanthopsis horrida (Nees) Nees, indigenous
 Acanthodium serrulatum Nees, accepted as Blepharis serrulata (Nees) Ficalho & Hiern, indigenous
 Acanthodium sinuatum Nees, accepted as Blepharis sinuata (Nees) C.B.Clarke, indigenous
 Acanthodium spathulare Nees, accepted as Acanthopsis spathularis (Nees) Schinz, indigenous
 Acanthodium squarrosum Nees, accepted as Blepharis squarrosa (Nees) T.Anderson, indigenous

Acanthopsis 
Genus Acanthopsis:
 Acanthopsis carduifolia (L.f.) Schinz, endemic
 Acanthopsis carduifolia (L.f.) Schinz var. glabra (Nees) Schinz, accepted as Acanthopsis glabra (Nees) H.M.Steyn, indigenous
 Acanthopsis carduifolia (L.f.) Schinz var. longearistata Schinz, accepted as Acanthopsis disperma Nees 
 Acanthopsis disperma Nees, indigenous
 Acanthopsis dispermoides H.M.Steyn, endemic
 Acanthopsis dregeana H.M.Steyn, endemic
 Acanthopsis dregeana H.M.Steyn subsp. dregeana, endemic
 Acanthopsis dregeana H.M.Steyn subsp. longispina H.M.Steyn, endemic
 Acanthopsis erosa H.M.Steyn, endemic
 Acanthopsis glabra (Nees) H.M.Steyn, endemic
 Acanthopsis glandulopalmata H.M.Steyn, endemic
 Acanthopsis glauca (E.Mey. ex Nees) Schinz, endemic
 Acanthopsis hoffmannseggiana (Nees) C.B.Clarke, indigenous
 Acanthopsis horrida (Nees) Nees, endemic
 Acanthopsis insueta H.M.Steyn, endemic
 Acanthopsis ludoviciana H.M.Steyn, endemic
 Acanthopsis nitida H.M.Steyn, endemic
 Acanthopsis scullyi (S.Moore) Oberm. endemic
 Acanthopsis spathularis (Nees) Schinz, endemic
 Acanthopsis tetragona H.M.Steyn, endemic
 Acanthopsis tetragona H.M.Steyn subsp. pedunculata H.M.Steyn, endemic
 Acanthopsis tetragona H.M.Steyn subsp. tetragona, endemic
 Acanthopsis trispina C.B.Clarke, accepted as Acanthopsis horrida (Nees) Nees, endemic
 Acanthopsis tuba H.M.Steyn, endemic
 Acanthopsis villosa H.M.Steyn, endemic

Acanthus 
Genus Acanthus:
 Acanthus arboreus Forssk. forma albiflorus Fiori, accepted as Acanthus polystachyus Delile 
 Acanthus arboreus Forssk. var. pubescens Thomson ex Oliv. accepted as Acanthus polystachyus Delile 
 Acanthus capensis L.f. accepted as Blepharis capensis (L.f.) Pers. 
 Acanthus carduifolius L.f. accepted as Acanthopsis carduifolia (L.f.) Schinz, indigenous
 Acanthus carduifolius Thunb. accepted as Acanthopsis carduifolia (L.f.) Schinz, indigenous
 Acanthus carduifolius Thunb. ß spica villosa E.Mey. accepted as Acanthopsis villosa H.M.Steyn 
 Acanthus flamandii De Wild. accepted as Acanthus polystachyus Delile 
 Acanthus furcatus L.f. accepted as Blepharis furcata (L.f.) Pers. 
 Acanthus glaber E.Mey. accepted as Acanthopsis glabra (Nees) H.M.Steyn, indigenous
 Acanthus glaucescens E.Mey. accepted as Acanthopsis glauca (E.Mey. ex Nees) Schinz, indigenous
 Acanthus glaucus E.Mey. accepted as Acanthopsis glauca (E.Mey. ex Nees) Schinz, indigenous
 Acanthus integrifolius L.f. accepted as Blepharis integrifolia (L.f.) E.Mey. ex Schinz var. integrifolia 
 Acanthus maderaspatensis L. accepted as Blepharis maderaspatensis (L.) Roth 
 Acanthus mollis L. not indigenous, cultivated, naturalised, invasive
 Acanthus polystachyus Delile, not indigenous, naturalised
 Acanthus polystachyus Delile var. pseudopubescens Cufod. accepted as Acanthus polystachyus Delile 
 Acanthus procumbens L.f. accepted as Blepharis procumbens (L.f.) Pers. 
 Acanthus pubescens (Thomson ex Oliv.) Engl. accepted as Acanthus polystachyus Delile, not indigenous, naturalised
 Acanthus spathularis E.Mey. accepted as Acanthopsis spathularis (Nees) Schinz, indigenous
 Acanthus ugandensis C.B.Clarke, accepted as Acanthus polystachyus Delile

Adhatoda 
Genus Adhatoda:
 Adhatoda anagalloides Nees, accepted as Justicia anagalloides (Nees) T.Anderson, indigenous
 Adhatoda andromeda (Lindau) C.B.Clarke, endemic
 Adhatoda anselliana Nees, accepted as Justicia anselliana (Nees) T.Anderson 
 Adhatoda betonica (L.) Nees, accepted as Justicia betonica L. indigenous
 Adhatoda capensis (Thunb.) Nees, accepted as Justicia capensis Thunb. indigenous
 Adhatoda capensis (Thunb.) Nees var. arenosa Nees, accepted as Justicia debilis (Forssk.) Vahl, indigenous
 Adhatoda cheiranthifolia Nees, accepted as Justicia betonica L. indigenous
 Adhatoda densiflora (Hochst.) J.C.Manning, accepted as Justicia natalensis (Nees) T.Anderson, endemic
 Adhatoda divaricata (Licht. ex Roem. & Schult.) Nees, accepted as Justicia divaricata Licht. ex Roem. & Schult. indigenous
 Adhatoda duvernoia (Nees) C.B.Clarke, accepted as Justicia adhatodoides (E.Mey. ex Nees) V.A.W.Graham, indigenous
 Adhatoda eylesiii S.Moore, accepted as Isoglossa eylesii (S.Moore) Brummitt 
 Adhatoda fasciata Nees, accepted as Justicia flava (Vahl) Vahl, indigenous
 Adhatoda flava (Vahl) Nees, accepted as Justicia flava (Vahl) Vahl, indigenous
 Adhatoda formosissima Klotzsch, accepted as Anisotes formosissimus (Klotzsch) Milne-Redh. 
 Adhatoda incana (Nees) Nees, accepted as Justicia incana (Nees) T.Anderson, indigenous
 Adhatoda lupulina Nees, accepted as Justicia betonica L. indigenous
 Adhatoda matammensis Schweinf. accepted as Justicia matammensis (Schweinf.) Oliv. indigenous
 Adhatoda mollissima Nees, accepted as Justicia dregei J.C.Manning & Goldblatt, indigenous
 Adhatoda natalensis Nees, accepted as Justicia natalensis (Nees) T.Anderson, indigenous
 Adhatoda odora (Forssk.) Nees, accepted as Justicia odora (Forssk.) Lam. indigenous
 Adhatoda petiolaris Nees, accepted as Justicia petiolaris (Nees) T.Anderson subsp. petiolaris, indigenous
 Adhatoda protracta (Nees) Nees, accepted as Justicia protracta (Nees) T.Anderson, indigenous
 Adhatoda thymifolia Nees, accepted as Justicia thymifolia (Nees) C.B.Clarke, indigenous
 Adhatoda tubulosa E.Mey. ex Nees, accepted as Justicia tubulosa (E.Mey. ex Nees) T.Anderson subsp. tubulosa, indigenous
 Adhatoda variegata Nees var. pallidior Nees, accepted as Justicia betonica L. indigenous

Angkalanthus 
Genus Angkalanthus:
 Angkalanthus transvaalensis A.Meeuse, accepted as Chorisochora transvaalensis (A.Meeuse) Vollesen, indigenous

Anisotes 
Genus Anisotes:
 Anisotes formosissimus (Klotzsch) Milne-Redh. indigenous
 Anisotes rogersii S.Moore, indigenous

Asteracantha 
Genus Asteracantha:
 Asteracantha longifolia (L.) Nees, accepted as Hygrophila auriculata (Schumach.) Heine

Asystasia 
Genus Asystasia:
 Asystasia atriplicifolia Bremek. endemic
 Asystasia coromandeliana Nees var. micrantha Nees, accepted as Asystasia gangetica (L.) T.Anderson subsp. micrantha (Nees) Ensermu, indigenous
 Asystasia gangetica (L.) T.Anderson, indigenous
 Asystasia gangetica (L.) T.Anderson subsp. micrantha (Nees) Ensermu, indigenous
 Asystasia mysorensis (Roth) T.Anderson, indigenous
 Asystasia natalensis C.B.Clarke, accepted as Salpinctium natalense (C.B.Clarke) T.J.Edwards 
 Asystasia pinguifolia T.J.Edwards, accepted as Asystasia gangetica (L.) T.Anderson subsp. micrantha (Nees) Ensermu, indigenous
 Asystasia retrocarpa T.J.Edwards, indigenous
 Asystasia schimperi T.Anderson, accepted as Asystasia mysorensis (Roth) T.Anderson, indigenous
 Asystasia stenosiphon C.B.Clarke, accepted as Salpinctium stenosiphon (C.B.Clarke) T.J.Edwards 
 Asystasia subbiflora C.B.Clarke, endemic
 Asystasia varia N.E.Br. endemic

Aulojusticia 
Genus Aulojusticia:
 Aulojusticia linifolia Lindau, accepted as Justicia linifolia (Lindau) V.A.W.Graham, indigenous

Avicennia 
Genus Avicennia:
 Avicennia marina (Forssk.) Vierh. indigenous

Barleria 
Genus Barleria:
 Barleria affinis C.B.Clarke, indigenous
 Barleria affinis C.B.Clarke subsp. affinis, indigenous
 Barleria alata S.Moore, accepted as Barleria lancifolia T.Anderson subsp. lancifolia 
 Barleria albida Lindau, accepted as Barleria senensis Klotzsch 
 Barleria albi-pilosa Hainz, accepted as Barleria matopensis S.Moore 
 Barleria albostellata C.B.Clarke, indigenous
 Barleria argillicola Oberm. endemic
 Barleria auriculata Schumach. accepted as Hygrophila auriculata (Schumach.) Heine 
 Barleria barbata E.Mey. ex C.B.Clarke, accepted as Barleria gueinzii Sond. indigenous
 Barleria bechuanensis C.B.Clarke, endemic
 Barleria bolusii Oberm. endemic
 Barleria bremekampii Oberm. indigenous
 Barleria burchelliana Nees, accepted as Barleria macrostegia Nees, indigenous
 Barleria cinereicaulis C.B.Clarke, accepted as Barleria lancifolia T.Anderson, indigenous
 Barleria coriacea Oberm. indigenous
 Barleria crossandriformis C.B.Clarke, indigenous
 Barleria delagoensis Oberm. indigenous
 Barleria dinteri Oberm. indigenous
 Barleria dolomiticola M.Balkwill & K.Balkwill, endemic
 Barleria eenii S.Moore, accepted as Barleria senensis Klotzsch 
 Barleria elegans S.Moore ex C.B.Clarke, indigenous
 Barleria elegans S.Moore ex C.B.Clarke subsp. orientalis I.Darbysh. indigenous
 Barleria exellii Benoist, accepted as Barleria lancifolia T.Anderson 
 Barleria galpinii C.B.Clarke, indigenous
 Barleria gossweileri S.Moore, accepted as Barleria lancifolia T.Anderson 
 Barleria greenii M.Balkwill & K.Balkwill, endemic
 Barleria gueinzii Sond. indigenous
 Barleria halimoides Nees, accepted as Petalidium halimoides (Nees) S.Moore 
 Barleria hereroensis Engl. accepted as Barleria lancifolia T.Anderson 
 Barleria heterotricha Lindau, indigenous
 Barleria heterotricha Lindau subsp. heterotricha, indigenous
 Barleria holubii C.B.Clarke, indigenous
 Barleria holubii C.B.Clarke subsp. holubii, indigenous
 Barleria ilicina E.Mey. ex T.Anderson, accepted as Barleria rigida Nees, indigenous
 Barleria irritans Nees, endemic
 Barleria irritans Nees var. rigida (Nees) C.B.Clarke, accepted as Barleria rigida Nees, indigenous
 Barleria jasminiflora C.B.Clarke, endemic
 Barleria lancifolia T.Anderson, indigenous
 Barleria latiloba Engl. accepted as Barleria lancifolia T.Anderson 
 Barleria lichtensteiniana Nees, indigenous
 Barleria longifolia L. accepted as Hygrophila auriculata (Schumach.) Heine 
 Barleria mackenii Hook.f. indigenous
 Barleria macrostegia Nees, indigenous
 Barleria marlothii Engl. accepted as Barleria damarensis T.Anderson 
 Barleria matopensis S.Moore, indigenous
 Barleria media C.B.Clarke, endemic
 Barleria meyeriana Nees, indigenous
 Barleria monticola Oberm. endemic
 Barleria mosdenensis Oberm. accepted as Barleria bolusii Oberm. indigenous
 Barleria mosdenensis Oberm. var. hirsuta Oberm. accepted as Barleria bolusii Oberm. indigenous
 Barleria namutonensis Oberm. accepted as Barleria prionitis L. subsp. prionitoides (Engl.) Brummitt & J.R.I.Wood 
 Barleria natalensis Lindau, endemic
 Barleria obtusa Nees, indigenous
 Barleria obtusa Nees var. cymulosa Hochst. accepted as Barleria obtusa Nees, indigenous
 Barleria ovata E.Mey. ex Nees, indigenous
 Barleria oxyphylla Lindau, indigenous
 Barleria papillosa T.Anderson, indigenous; nend
 Barleria pretoriensis C.B.Clarke, indigenous
 Barleria prionitis L. indigenous
 Barleria prionitis L. subsp. delagoensis (Oberm.) Brummitt & J.R.I.Wood, accepted as Barleria delagoensis Oberm. indigenous
 Barleria pungens L.f. endemic
 Barleria quadriloba Oberm. indigenous
 Barleria randii S.Moore, indigenous
 Barleria rautanenii Schinz, accepted as Barleria lancifolia T.Anderson 
 Barleria rehmannii C.B.Clarke, indigenous
 Barleria repens Nees, indigenous
 Barleria rigida Nees, indigenous
 Barleria rigida Nees var. ilicina (E.Mey. ex T.Anderson) Oberm. accepted as Barleria rigida Nees, indigenous
 Barleria rogersii S.Moore, accepted as Barleria taitensis S.Moore subsp. rogersii (S.Moore) I.Darbysh. indigenous
 Barleria rotundifolia Oberm. endemic
 Barleria sacani Klotzsch ex Lindau, accepted as Neuracanthus africanus T.Anderson ex S.Moore var. africanus 
 Barleria saxatilis Oberm. indigenous
 Barleria schenckii Schinz, accepted as Barleria rigida Nees 
 Barleria senensis Klotzsch, indigenous
 Barleria spathulata N.E.Br. accepted as Barleria senensis Klotzsch 
 Barleria spinulosa Klotzsch, indigenous
 Barleria spinulosa Klotzsch subsp. spinulosa, indigenous
 Barleria stimulans E.Mey. ex Nees, endemic
 Barleria taitensis S.Moore, indigenous
 Barleria taitensis S.Moore subsp. rogersii (S.Moore) I.Darbysh. indigenous
 Barleria transvaalensis Oberm. accepted as Barleria virgula C.B.Clarke, endemic
 Barleria ventricosa Hochst. ex Nees, indigenous
 Barleria virgula C.B.Clarke, indigenous
 Barleria wilmsiana Lindau, endemic
 Barleria wilmsii Lindau ex C.B.Clarke, accepted as Barleria wilmsiana Lindau 
 Barleria woodii C.B.Clarke, accepted as Barleria natalensis Lindau

Blepharacanthus 
Genus Blepharacanthus:
 Blepharacanthus capensis (L.f.) Nees, accepted as Blepharis capensis (L.f.) Pers. indigenous
 Blepharacanthus carduifolius (L.f.) Nees, accepted as Acanthopsis carduifolia (L.f.) Schinz, indigenous

Blepharis 
Genus Blepharis:
 Blepharis acanthodioides Klotzsch, indigenous
 Blepharis acaulis Lindau, accepted as Acanthopsis disperma Nees 
 Blepharis acuminata Oberm. endemic
 Blepharis aequisepala Vollesen, endemic
 Blepharis angusta (Nees) T.Anderson, endemic
 Blepharis aspera Oberm. indigenous
 Blepharis boerhaviifolia Pers. accepted as Blepharis maderaspatensis (L.) Roth 
 Blepharis bossii Oberm. accepted as Blepharis obmitrata C.B.Clarke 
 Blepharis breyeri Oberm. endemic
 Blepharis caloneura S.Moore var. angustifolia Oberm. accepted as Blepharis tenuiramea S.Moore 
 Blepharis capensis (L.f.) Pers. endemic
 Blepharis capensis (L.f.) Pers. var. latibracteata Oberm. accepted as Blepharis capensis (L.f.) Pers. indigenous
 Blepharis capensis (L.f.) Pers. var. prostrata Oberm. accepted as Blepharis capensis (L.f.) Pers. indigenous
 Blepharis carduifolia (L.f.) T.Anderson, accepted as Acanthopsis carduifolia (L.f.) Schinz, indigenous
 Blepharis carduifolia (L.f.) T.Anderson var. glabra (Nees) T.Anderson, accepted as Acanthopsis glabra (Nees) H.M.Steyn, indigenous
 Blepharis clarkei Schinz, accepted as Blepharis integrifolia (L.f.) E.Mey. ex Schinz var. clarkei (Schinz) Oberm. 
 Blepharis dichotoma Engl. accepted as Blepharis grossa (Nees) T.Anderson 
 Blepharis dilatata C.B.Clarke, endemic
 Blepharis dilatata C.B.Clarke var. explicator C.B.Clarke, accepted as Blepharis subvolubilis C.B.Clarke, indigenous
 Blepharis diversispina (Nees) C.B.Clarke, indigenous
 Blepharis ecklonii C.B.Clarke, accepted as Blepharis hirtinervia (Nees) T.Anderson, indigenous
 Blepharis espinosa E.Phillips, indigenous
 Blepharis espinosa E.Phillips var. spinosa Oberm. accepted as Blepharis espinosa E.Phillips, indigenous
 Blepharis extenuata S.Moore, accepted as Blepharis macra (Nees) Vollesen, endemic
 Blepharis fenestralis Vollesen, endemic
 Blepharis furcata (L.f.) Pers. indigenous
 Blepharis gerlindae P.G.Mey. accepted as Blepharis obmitrata C.B.Clarke 
 Blepharis glauca (E.Mey. ex Nees) T.Anderson, accepted as Acanthopsis glauca (E.Mey. ex Nees) Schinz, indigenous
 Blepharis grisea S.Moore, accepted as Blepharis diversispina (Nees) C.B.Clarke 
 Blepharis grossa (Nees) T.Anderson, indigenous
 Blepharis hildebrandii Lindau, accepted as Blepharis integrifolia (L.f.) E.Mey. ex Schinz var. integrifolia 
 Blepharis hirtinervia (Nees) T.Anderson, endemic
 Blepharis ilicina Oberm. endemic
 Blepharis inaequalis C.B.Clarke, endemic
 Blepharis inermis (Nees) C.B.Clarke, endemic
 Blepharis innocua C.B.Clarke, endemic
 Blepharis innocua C.B.Clarke var. lancifolia Oberm. accepted as Blepharis innocua C.B.Clarke, present
 Blepharis integrifolia (L.f.) E.Mey. ex Schinz, indigenous
 Blepharis integrifolia (L.f.) E.Mey. ex Schinz var. clarkei (Schinz) Oberm. indigenous
 Blepharis integrifolia (L.f.) E.Mey. ex Schinz var. integrifolia, indigenous
 Blepharis integrifolia (L.f.) E.Mey. ex Schinz var. setosa (Nees) Oberm. accepted as Blepharis integrifolia (L.f.) E.Mey. ex Schinz var. integrifolia, present
 Blepharis laevifolia Vollesen, endemic
 Blepharis leendertziae Oberm. indigenous
 Blepharis longispica C.B.Clarke, endemic
 Blepharis macra (Nees) Vollesen, indigenous
 Blepharis maderaspatensis (L.) Roth, indigenous
 Blepharis maderaspatensis (L.) Roth subsp. rubiifolia (Schumach.) Napper, accepted as Blepharis maderaspatensis (L.) Roth, present
 Blepharis marginata (Nees) C.B.Clarke, endemic
 Blepharis mitrata C.B.Clarke, indigenous
 Blepharis molluginifolia Pers. accepted as Blepharis integrifolia (L.f.) E.Mey. ex Schinz var. integrifolia 
 Blepharis naegelsbachii Oberm. accepted as Blepharis obmitrata C.B.Clarke 
 Blepharis natalensis Oberm. endemic
 Blepharis obermeyerae Vollesen, indigenous
 Blepharis obtusisepala Oberm. endemic
 Blepharis procumbens (L.f.) Pers. endemic
 Blepharis rubiifolia (Schumach.) Napper, accepted as Blepharis maderaspatensis (L.) Roth 
 Blepharis saxatilis Oberm. accepted as Blepharis subvolubilis C.B.Clarke, indigenous
 Blepharis scullyi S.Moore, accepted as Acanthopsis scullyi (S.Moore) Oberm. indigenous
 Blepharis sericea Vollesen, endemic
 Blepharis serrulata (Nees) Ficalho & Hiern, indigenous
 Blepharis setosa Nees, accepted as Blepharis integrifolia (L.f.) E.Mey. ex Schinz var. integrifolia 
 Blepharis sinuata (Nees) C.B.Clarke, endemic
 Blepharis spathularis (Nees) T.Anderson, accepted as Acanthopsis spathularis (Nees) Schinz, indigenous
 Blepharis spinipes Vollesen, endemic
 Blepharis squarrosa (Nees) T.Anderson, endemic
 Blepharis stainbankiae C.B.Clarke, endemic
 Blepharis stainbankiae C.B.Clarke var. explicator (C.B.Clarke) Oberm. accepted as Blepharis subvolubilis C.B.Clarke 
 Blepharis subglabra Vollesen, endemic
 Blepharis subvolubilis C.B.Clarke, indigenous
 Blepharis subvolubilis C.B.Clarke var. longifolia Oberm. accepted as Blepharis subvolubilis C.B.Clarke, indigenous
 Blepharis swaziensis Vollesen, indigenous
 Blepharis teaguei Oberm. accepted as Blepharis maderaspatensis (L.) Roth 
 Blepharis transvaalensis Schinz, indigenous
 Blepharis trispinosa Hainz, accepted as Blepharis furcata (L.f.) Pers. 
 Blepharis uniflora C.B.Clarke, indigenous
 Blepharis villosa C.B.Clarke, accepted as Blepharis mitrata C.B.Clarke, present

Calophanes 
Genus Calophanes:
 Calophanes crenata Schinz, accepted as Asystasia mysorensis (Roth) T.Anderson, indigenous
 Calophanes perrottetii Nees, accepted as Dyschoriste perrottetii (Nees) Kuntze 
 Calophanes persoonii (Nees) T.Anderson, accepted as Dyschoriste setigera (Pers.) J.C.Manning & Goldblatt 
 Calophanes radicans T.Anderson, accepted as Dyschoriste mutica (S.Moore) C.B.Clarke 
 Calophanes radicans T.Anderson var. mutica S.Moore, accepted as Dyschoriste mutica (S.Moore) C.B.Clarke 
 Calophanes setosus Nees, accepted as Ruelliopsis setosa (Nees) C.B.Clarke

Chaetacanthus 
Genus Chaetacanthus (synonym of Dyschoriste):
 Chaetacanthus burchellii Nees, accepted as Dyschoriste burchellii (Nees) Kuntze, indigenous
 Chaetacanthus costatus Nees, accepted as Dyschoriste costata (Nees) Kuntze, endemic
 Chaetacanthus glandulosus Nees, accepted as Dyschoriste setigera (Pers.) J.C.Manning & Goldblatt 
 Chaetacanthus persoonii C.B.Clarke, accepted as Dyschoriste setigera (Pers.) J.C.Manning & Goldblatt 
 Chaetacanthus setiger (Pers.) Lindl. accepted as Dyschoriste setigera (Pers.) J.C.Manning & Goldblatt, indigenous

Chorisochora 
Genus Chorisochora:
 Chorisochora transvaalensis (A.Meeuse) Vollesen, indigenous

Crabbea 
Genus Crabbea:
 Crabbea acaulis N.E.Br. indigenous
 Crabbea angustifolia Nees, endemic
 Crabbea cirsioides (Nees) Nees, accepted as Crabbea hirsuta Harv. 
 Crabbea galpinii C.B.Clarke, indigenous
 Crabbea hirsuta Harv. indigenous
 Crabbea nana Nees, indigenous
 Crabbea ovalifolia Ficalho & Hiern, indigenous
 Crabbea pedunculata N.E.Br. accepted as Crabbea nana Nees 
 Crabbea reticulata C.B.Clarke, accepted as Crabbea velutina S.Moore 
 Crabbea robusta N.E.Br. accepted as Crabbea hirsuta Harv. 
 Crabbea undulatifolia Engl. accepted as Crabbea angustifolia Nees 
 Crabbea velutina S.Moore, indigenous

Crossandra 
Genus Crossandra:
 Crossandra fruticulosa Lindau, indigenous
 Crossandra greenstockii S.Moore, indigenous
 Crossandra mucronata Lindau, indigenous
 Crossandra zuluensis W.T.Vos & T.J.Edwards, indigenous

Dianthera 
Genus Dianthera:
 Dianthera bicalyculata Retz. accepted as Dicliptera paniculata (Forssk.) I.Darbysh. 
 Dianthera debilis Forssk. accepted as Justicia debilis (Forssk.) Vahl, indigenous
 Dianthera flava Vahl, accepted as Justicia flava (Vahl) Vahl, indigenous
 Dianthera malabarica L.f. accepted as Dicliptera paniculata (Forssk.) I.Darbysh. 
 Dianthera odora Forssk. accepted as Justicia odora (Forssk.) Lam. indigenous
 Dianthera paniculata Forssk. accepted as Dicliptera paniculata (Forssk.) I.Darbysh. 
 Dianthera verticillata Forssk. accepted as Dicliptera verticillata (Forssk.) C.Chr.

Diapedium 
Genus Diapedium:
 Diapedium clinopodium (Nees) Kuntze, accepted as Dicliptera clinopodia Nees, indigenous
 Diapedium clinopodium (Nees) Kuntze var. minor S.Moore, accepted as Dicliptera clinopodia Nees, indigenous

Dicliptera 
Genus Dicliptera:
 Dicliptera capensis Nees, endemic
 Dicliptera cernua (Hook.f. ex Nees) I.Darbysh. accepted as Dicliptera cernua (Hook.f. ex Nees) J.C.Manning & Goldblatt, indigenous
 Dicliptera cernua (Hook.f. ex Nees) J.C.Manning & Goldblatt, indigenous
 Dicliptera cliffordii (K.Balkwill) J.C.Manning & Goldblatt, indigenous
 Dicliptera clinopodia Nees, indigenous
 Dicliptera decorticans (K.Balkwill) I.Darbysh. indigenous
 Dicliptera decorticans (K.Balkwill) J.C.Manning & Goldblatt, accepted as Dicliptera decorticans (K.Balkwill) I.Darbysh. indigenous
 Dicliptera divaricata Compton, accepted as Dicliptera minor C.B.Clarke subsp. divaricata (Compton) I.Darbysh. indigenous
 Dicliptera eenii S.Moore, indigenous
 Dicliptera extenta S.Moore, indigenous
 Dicliptera fionae K.Balkwill, endemic
 Dicliptera fruticosa K.Balkwill, endemic
 Dicliptera gillilandiorum (K.Balkwill) I.Darbysh. indigenous
 Dicliptera gillilandiorum (K.Balkwill) J.C.Manning & Goldblatt, accepted as Dicliptera gillilandiorum (K.Balkwill) I.Darbysh. indigenous
 Dicliptera heterostegia Nees, indigenous
 Dicliptera leistneri K.Balkwill, endemic
 Dicliptera magaliesbergensis K.Balkwill, endemic
 Dicliptera marlothii Engl. accepted as Megalochlamys marlothii (Engl.) Lindau 
 Dicliptera minor C.B.Clarke, indigenous
 Dicliptera minor C.B.Clarke subsp. divaricata (Compton) I.Darbysh. indigenous
 Dicliptera minor C.B.Clarke subsp. minor, indigenous
 Dicliptera minor C.B.Clarke subsp. pratis-manna K.Balkwill, endemic
 Dicliptera monroi S.Moore, indigenous
 Dicliptera mossambicensis Klotzsch, accepted as Dicliptera heterostegia Nees, indigenous
 Dicliptera ovata C.Presl, accepted as Isoglossa ovata (Nees) Lindau, indigenous
 Dicliptera paniculata (Forssk.) I.Darbysh. indigenous
 Dicliptera paniculata (Forssk.) J.C.Manning & Goldblatt, accepted as Dicliptera paniculata (Forssk.) I.Darbysh. 
 Dicliptera propinqua Nees, accepted as Dicliptera capensis Nees, indigenous
 Dicliptera quintasii Lindau, indigenous
 Dicliptera schumanniana Schinz, accepted as Megalochlamys marlothii (Engl.) Lindau 
 Dicliptera spinulosa Hochst. ex K.Balkwill, accepted as Dicliptera verticillata (Forssk.) C.Chr. indigenous
 Dicliptera swynnertonii S.Moore, indigenous
 Dicliptera transvaalensis C.B.Clarke, indigenous
 Dicliptera umbellata (Vahl) Juss. accepted as Dicliptera verticillata (Forssk.) C.Chr. 
 Dicliptera verticillata (Forssk.) C.Chr. indigenous

Dilivaria 
Genus Dilivaria:
 Dilivaria horrida Nees, accepted as Acanthopsis horrida (Nees) Nees, indigenous

Dinteracanthus 
Genus Dinteracanthus:
 Dinteracanthus asper Schinz, accepted as Ruellia aspera (Schinz) E.Phillips 
 Dinteracanthus marlothii (Engl.) Schinz, accepted as Ruellia diversifolia S.Moore

Dipteracanthus 
Genus Dipteracanthus:
 Dipteracanthus cordifolius Nees, accepted as Ruellia cordata Thunb. indigenous
 Dipteracanthus zeyheri Sond. accepted as Ruellia pilosa L.f. indigenous

Duosperma 
Genus Duosperma:
 Duosperma crenatum (Lindau) P.G.Mey. indigenous

Duvernoia 
Genus Duvernoia:
 Duvernoia aconitiflora A.Meeuse, accepted as Justicia aconitiflora (A.Meeuse) Cubey, indigenous
 Duvernoia adhatodoides E.Mey. ex Nees, accepted as Justicia adhatodoides (E.Mey. ex Nees) V.A.W.Graham, endemic
 Duvernoia andromeda Lindau, accepted as Adhatoda andromeda (Lindau) C.B.Clarke, indigenous

Dyschoriste 
Genus Dyschoriste:
 Dyschoriste burchellii (Nees) Kuntze, indigenous
 Dyschoriste costata (Nees) Kuntze, endemic
 Dyschoriste depressa (L.) Nees, indigenous
 Dyschoriste erecta C.B.Clarke, endemic
 Dyschoriste fischeri Lindau, indigenous
 Dyschoriste fleckii Schinz, accepted as Ruelliopsis damarensis S.Moore 
 Dyschoriste monroi S.Moore, indigenous
 Dyschoriste mutica (S.Moore) C.B.Clarke, indigenous
 Dyschoriste perrottetii (Nees) Kuntze, indigenous
 Dyschoriste pseuderecta Mildbr. indigenous
 Dyschoriste rogersii S.Moore, indigenous
 Dyschoriste setigera (Pers.) J.C.Manning & Goldblatt, indigenous
 Dyschoriste setigera (Pers.) Vollesen, accepted as Dyschoriste setigera (Pers.) J.C.Manning & Goldblatt, indigenous
 Dyschoriste transvaalensis C.B.Clarke, indigenous

Ecbolium 
Genus Ecbolium:
 Ecbolium clarkei Hiern, indigenous
 Ecbolium cognatum N.E.Br. accepted as Megalochlamys revoluta (Lindau) Vollesen subsp. cognata (N.E.Br.) Vollesen 
 Ecbolium flanaganii C.B.Clarke, endemic
 Ecbolium glabratum Vollesen, indigenous
 Ecbolium hamatum (Klotzsch) C.B.Clarke, accepted as Megalochlamys hamata (Klotzsch) Vollesen

Ecteinanthus 
Genus Ecteinanthus:
 Ecteinanthus divaricatus T.Anderson, accepted as Isoglossa ciliata (Nees) Engl. indigenous
 Ecteinanthus ecklonianus (Nees) T.Anderson, accepted as Isoglossa origanoides (Nees) S.Moore, indigenous
 Ecteinanthus origanoides (Nees) T.Anderson, accepted as Isoglossa origanoides (Nees) S.Moore, indigenous
 Ecteinanthus ovata (E.Mey. ex Nees) T.Anderson, accepted as Isoglossa ovata (Nees) Lindau, indigenous
 Ecteinanthus prolixus (Nees) T.Anderson, accepted as Isoglossa prolixa (Nees) Lindau, indigenous

Elytraria 
Genus Elytraria:
 Elytraria lyrata Vahl, indigenous

Eranthemum 
Genus Eranthemum:
 Eranthemum decurrens Hochst. ex Nees, accepted as Ruspolia decurrens (Hochst. ex Nees) Milne-Redh. 
 Eranthemum hildebrandtii (Lindau) C.B.Clarke, accepted as Pseuderanthemum hildebrandtii Lindau, indigenous
 Eranthemum seticalyx C.B.Clarke, accepted as Ruspolia seticalyx (C.B.Clarke) Milne-Redh. 
 Eranthemum subviscosum C.B.Clarke, accepted as Pseuderanthemum subviscosum (C.B.Clarke) Stapf, indigenous

Gendarussa 
Genus Gendarussa:
 Gendarussa capensis (Thunb.) Nees, accepted as Justicia capensis Thunb. indigenous
 Gendarussa debilis (Forssk.) Nees, accepted as Justicia debilis (Forssk.) Vahl, indigenous
 Gendarussa densiflora Hochst. accepted as Justicia natalensis (Nees) T.Anderson, indigenous
 Gendarussa incana Nees, accepted as Justicia incana (Nees) T.Anderson, indigenous
 Gendarussa incana Nees var. villosa Nees, accepted as Justicia debilis (Forssk.) Vahl 
 Gendarussa leptantha Nees, accepted as Justicia tubulosa (E.Mey. ex Nees) T.Anderson subsp. tubulosa, indigenous
 Gendarussa mollis Hochst. accepted as Justicia protracta (Nees) T.Anderson, indigenous
 Gendarussa orchioides (L.f.) Nees, accepted as Justicia cuneata Vahl subsp. latifolia (Nees) Immelman 
& Gendarussa orchioides (L.f.) Nees var. latifolia Nees, accepted as Justicia cuneata Vahl subsp. latifolia (Nees) Immelman, indigenous
 Gendarussa protracta Nees, accepted as Justicia protracta (Nees) T.Anderson, indigenous
 Gendarussa prunellaefolia Hochst. accepted as Justicia protracta (Nees) T.Anderson, indigenous

Glossochilus 
Genus Glossochilus:
 Glossochilus burchellii Nees, indigenous
 Glossochilus parviflorus Hutch. accepted as Asystasia mysorensis (Roth) T.Anderson, endemic

Hemigraphis 
Genus Hemigraphis:
 Hemigraphis abyssinica (Hochst. ex Nees) C.B.Clarke, accepted as Hygrophila abyssinica (Hochst. ex Nees) T.Anderson 
 Hemigraphis prunelloides S.Moore, accepted as Hygrophila prunelloides (S.Moore) Heine

Hygrophila 
Genus Hygrophila:
 Hygrophila auriculata (Schumach.) Heine, indigenous
 Hygrophila crenata Lindau, accepted as Duosperma crenatum (Lindau) P.G.Mey. 
 Hygrophila spinosa T.Anderson, accepted as Hygrophila auriculata (Schumach.) Heine

Hypoestes 
Genus Hypoestes:
 Hypoestes antennifera S.Moore, accepted as Hypoestes aristata (Vahl) Sol. ex Roem. & Schult. var. aristata 
 Hypoestes aristata (Vahl) Sol. ex Roem. & Schult. indigenous
 Hypoestes aristata (Vahl) Sol. ex Roem. & Schult. var. alba K.Balkwill, indigenous
 Hypoestes aristata (Vahl) Sol. ex Roem. & Schult. var. aristata, indigenous
 Hypoestes aristata (Vahl) Sol. ex Roem. & Schult. var. thiniorum K.Balkwill, endemic
 Hypoestes depauperata Lindau, accepted as Hypoestes forskaolii (Vahl) R.Br. 
 Hypoestes forskaolii (Vahl) R.Br. indigenous
 Hypoestes phaylopsoides S.Moore, accepted as Hypoestes triflora (Forssk.) Roem. & Schult. 
 Hypoestes phyllostachya Baker, not indigenous, cultivated, naturalised, invasive
 Hypoestes triflora (Forssk.) Roem. & Schult. indigenous
 Hypoestes verticillaris (L.f.) Sol. ex Roem. & Schult. accepted as Hypoestes aristata (Vahl) Sol. ex Roem. & Schult. var. aristata

Isoglossa 
Genus Isoglossa:
 Isoglossa bachmannii Lindau, accepted as Isoglossa ovata (Nees) Lindau, indigenous
 Isoglossa bolusii C.B.Clarke, accepted as Isoglossa macowanii C.B.Clarke, indigenous
 Isoglossa bolusii C.B.Clarke, accepted as Isoglossa delicatula C.B.Clarke, indigenous
 Isoglossa ciliata (Nees) Engl. indigenous
 Isoglossa cooperi C.B.Clarke, endemic
 Isoglossa delicatula C.B.Clarke, indigenous
 Isoglossa densa N.E.Br. accepted as Isoglossa ciliata (Nees) Engl. endemic
 Isoglossa eckloniana (Nees) Lindau, accepted as Isoglossa origanoides (Nees) S.Moore, indigenous
 Isoglossa glandulosissima K.Balkwill, indigenous
 Isoglossa gracilenta K.Balkwill, endemic
 Isoglossa grantii C.B.Clarke, accepted as Isoglossa woodii C.B.Clarke, indigenous
 Isoglossa hypoestiflora Lindau, indigenous
 Isoglossa macowanii C.B.Clarke, indigenous
 Isoglossa origanoides (Nees) S.Moore, endemic
 Isoglossa ovata (Nees) Lindau, endemic
 Isoglossa pondoensis K.Balkwill, endemic
 Isoglossa prolixa (Nees) Lindau, endemic
 Isoglossa stipitata C.B.Clarke, accepted as Isoglossa woodii C.B.Clarke, endemic
 Isoglossa sylvatica C.B.Clarke, accepted as Isoglossa ciliata (Nees) Engl. endemic
 Isoglossa woodii C.B.Clarke, endemic

Justicia 
Genus Justicia:
 Justicia aconitiflora (A.Meeuse) Cubey, indigenous
 Justicia aconitiflora (A.Meeuse) Vollesen, accepted as Justicia aconitiflora (A.Meeuse) Cubey, indigenous
 Justicia adhatodoides (E.Mey. ex Nees) V.A.W.Graham, endemic
 Justicia anagalloides (Nees) T.Anderson, indigenous
 Justicia andromeda (Lindau) J.C.Manning & Goldblatt, accepted as Adhatoda andromeda (Lindau) C.B.Clarke, endemic
 Justicia atherstonei T.Anderson, accepted as Justicia spartioides T.Anderson, indigenous
 Justicia australis (P.G.Mey.) Vollesen, indigenous
 Justicia betonica L. indigenous
 Justicia betonicoides C.B.Clarke, accepted as Justicia betonica L. indigenous
 Justicia bicalyculata (Retz.) Vahl, accepted as Dicliptera paniculata (Forssk.) I.Darbysh. 
 Justicia bolusii C.B.Clarke, endemic
 Justicia bracteata (Hochst.) Zarb, indigenous
 Justicia campylostemon (Nees) T.Anderson, indigenous
 Justicia capensis Eckl. ex Nees, accepted as Dicliptera cernua (Hook.f. ex Nees) J.C.Manning & Goldblatt 
 Justicia capensis Thunb. indigenous
 Justicia cheiranthifolia (Nees) C.B.Clarke, accepted as Justicia betonica L. indigenous
 Justicia clinopodia E.Mey. accepted as Dicliptera clinopodia Nees, indigenous
 Justicia crassiradix C.B.Clarke var. hispida C.B.Clarke, accepted as Justicia anagalloides (Nees) T.Anderson 
 Justicia crassiuscula (P.G.Mey.) J.C.Manning & Goldblatt, indigenous
 Justicia cuneata Vahl, indigenous
 Justicia cuneata Vahl subsp. cuneata, endemic
 Justicia cuneata Vahl subsp. latifolia (Nees) Immelman, endemic
 Justicia cuspidata Vahl, accepted as Dicliptera verticillata (Forssk.) C.Chr. 
 Justicia debilis (Forssk.) Vahl, indigenous
 Justicia debilis (Forssk.) Vahl var. angustifolia (Nees) Oliv. accepted as Justicia bracteata (Hochst.) Zarb 
 Justicia densiflora (Hochst.) J.C.Manning & Goldblatt, accepted as Justicia natalensis (Nees) T.Anderson, endemic
 Justicia dinteri S.Moore, accepted as Justicia heterocarpa T.Anderson subsp. dinteri (S.Moore) Hedren, indigenous
 Justicia distichotricha Lindau, indigenous
 Justicia divaricata (Licht. ex Roem. & Schult.) T.Anderson, accepted as Justicia divaricata Licht. ex Roem. & Schult. indigenous
 Justicia divaricata Licht. ex Roem. & Schult. indigenous
 Justicia dregei J.C.Manning & Goldblatt, indigenous
 Justicia exigua S.Moore, indigenous
 Justicia fasciata (Nees) T.Anderson, accepted as Justicia flava (Vahl) Vahl, indigenous
 Justicia flava (Vahl) Vahl, indigenous
 Justicia genistifolia Engl. subsp. australe (P.G.Mey.) J.C.Manning & Goldblatt, accepted as Justicia australis (P.G.Mey.) Vollesen, indigenous
 Justicia glabra K.D.Koenig ex Roxb. accepted as Justicia scandens Vahl, indigenous
 Justicia guerkeana Schinz, indigenous
 Justicia heterocarpa T.Anderson, indigenous
 Justicia heterocarpa T.Anderson subsp. dinteri (S.Moore) Hedren, indigenous
 Justicia heterostegia E.Mey. accepted as Dicliptera heterostegia Nees 
 Justicia incana (Nees) T.Anderson, indigenous
 Justicia incerta C.B.Clarke, accepted as Justicia petiolaris (Nees) T.Anderson subsp. petiolaris, indigenous
 Justicia intercepta E.Mey. accepted as Isoglossa ciliata (Nees) Engl. indigenous
 Justicia karroica J.C.Manning & Goldblatt, endemic
 Justicia kraussii C.B.Clarke, accepted as Justicia protracta (Nees) T.Anderson, indigenous
 Justicia kraussii C.B.Clarke var. florida C.B.Clarke, accepted as Justicia protracta (Nees) T.Anderson, indigenous
 Justicia leptantha (Nees) Lindau, accepted as Justicia tubulosa (E.Mey. ex Nees) T.Anderson subsp. tubulosa, indigenous
 Justicia leptantha (Nees) Lindau subsp. late-ovata (C.B.Clarke) J.C.Manning & Goldblatt, accepted as Justicia tubulosa (E.Mey. ex Nees) T.Anderson subsp. late-ovata (C.B.Clarke) J.C.Manning & Goldblatt, indigenous
 Justicia leucoderme Schinz, indigenous
 Justicia ligulata Lam. accepted as Dicliptera paniculata (Forssk.) I.Darbysh. 
 Justicia linifolia (Lindau) J.C.Manning & Goldblatt, accepted as Justicia linifolia (Lindau) V.A.W.Graham, indigenous
 Justicia linifolia (Lindau) V.A.W.Graham, indigenous
 Justicia lycioides Schinz, accepted as Justicia odora (Forssk.) Lam. 
 Justicia malabarica (L.f.) Aiton, accepted as Dicliptera paniculata (Forssk.) I.Darbysh. 
 Justicia matammensis (Schweinf.) Oliv. indigenous
 Justicia minima A.Meeuse, endemic
 Justicia montis-salinarum A.Meeuse, endemic
 Justicia namaensis Schinz, accepted as Justicia divaricata Licht. ex Roem. & Schult. 
 Justicia natalensis (Nees) T.Anderson, endemic
 Justicia nepeta S.Moore, accepted as Justicia divaricata Licht. ex Roem. & Schult. 
 Justicia nkandlaensis (Immelman) J.C.Manning & Goldblatt, endemic
 Justicia odora (Forssk.) Lam. indigenous
 Justicia orchioides L.f. endemic
 Justicia orchioides L.f. subsp. glabrata Immelman, endemic
 Justicia orchioides L.f. subsp. orchioides, endemic
 Justicia ovata E.Mey. accepted as Isoglossa ovata (Nees) Lindau, indigenous
 Justicia pallidior (Nees) C.B.Clarke, accepted as Justicia betonica L. indigenous
 Justicia pallidior (Nees) C.B.Clarke var. cooperi C.B.Clarke, accepted as Justicia betonica L. indigenous
 Justicia palustris (Hochst.) T.Anderson var. dispersa Lindau, accepted as Justicia flava (Vahl) Vahl 
 Justicia petiolaris (Nees) T.Anderson, indigenous
 Justicia petiolaris (Nees) T.Anderson subsp. bowiei (C.B.Clarke) Immelman, endemic
 Justicia petiolaris (Nees) T.Anderson subsp. incerta (C.B.Clarke) Immelman, accepted as Justicia petiolaris (Nees) T.Anderson subsp. petiolaris, endemic
 Justicia petiolaris (Nees) T.Anderson subsp. petiolaris, indigenous
 Justicia polymorpha Schinz, accepted as Justicia odora (Forssk.) Lam. 
 Justicia prolifera C.Presl, accepted as Isoglossa prolixa (Nees) Lindau, indigenous
 Justicia prolixa E.Mey. accepted as Isoglossa prolixa (Nees) Lindau, indigenous
 Justicia protracta (Nees) T.Anderson, indigenous
 Justicia protracta (Nees) T.Anderson subsp. rhodesiana (S.Moore) Immelman, accepted as Justicia rhodesiana S.Moore, indigenous
 Justicia psammophila Mildbr. accepted as Justicia anagalloides (Nees) T.Anderson 
 Justicia puberula Immelman, endemic
 Justicia pulegioides C.B.Clarke, accepted as Justicia protracta (Nees) T.Anderson, indigenous
 Justicia pulegioides C.B.Clarke subsp. late-ovata C.B.Clarke, accepted as Justicia tubulosa (E.Mey. ex Nees) T.Anderson subsp. late-ovata (C.B.Clarke) J.C.Manning & Goldblatt, indigenous
 Justicia rhodesiana S.Moore, indigenous
 Justicia saxatilis (Munday) J.C.Manning & Goldblatt, endemic
 Justicia scandens Vahl, indigenous
 Justicia spartioides T.Anderson, indigenous
 Justicia thymifolia (Nees) C.B.Clarke, endemic
 Justicia tubulosa (E.Mey. ex Nees) T.Anderson, endemic
 Justicia tubulosa (E.Mey. ex Nees) T.Anderson subsp. late-ovata (C.B.Clarke) J.C.Manning & Goldblatt, endemic
 Justicia tubulosa (E.Mey. ex Nees) T.Anderson subsp. tubulosa, endemic
 Justicia umbellata Vahl, accepted as Dicliptera verticillata (Forssk.) C.Chr. 
 Justicia uncinulata Oliv. accepted as Justicia anagalloides (Nees) T.Anderson 
 Justicia uninervis S.Moore, accepted as Justicia betonica L. indigenous
 Justicia woodii C.B.Clarke, accepted as Justicia protracta (Nees) T.Anderson, indigenous

Lepidagathis 
Genus Lepidagathis:
 Lepidagathis scabra C.B.Clarke, indigenous
 Lepidagathis terminalis Hochst. ex Nees, accepted as Lepidagathis scariosa Nees

Leptostachya 
Genus Leptostachya:
 Leptostachya campylostemon Nees, accepted as Justicia campylostemon (Nees) T.Anderson, indigenous

Mackaya 
Genus Mackaya:
 Mackaya bella Harv. indigenous

Macrorungia 
Genus Macrorungia:
 Macrorungia formosissima (Klotzsch) C.B.Clarke, accepted as Anisotes formosissimus (Klotzsch) Milne-Redh. 
 Macrorungia galpinii Baden, accepted as Metarungia galpinii (Baden) Baden 
 Macrorungia longistrobus C.B.Clarke, accepted as Metarungia longistrobus (C.B.Clarke) Baden

Megalochlamys 
Genus Megalochlamys:
 Megalochlamys hamata (Klotzsch) Vollesen, indigenous
 Megalochlamys kenyensis Vollesen, indigenous
 Megalochlamys kenyensis Vollesen subsp. australis Vollesen, endemic
 Megalochlamys revoluta (Lindau) Vollesen, indigenous
 Megalochlamys revoluta (Lindau) Vollesen subsp. cognata (N.E.Br.) Vollesen, indigenous

Metarungia 
Genus Metarungia:
 Metarungia galpinii (Baden) Baden, endemic
 Metarungia longistrobus (C.B.Clarke) Baden, indigenous
 Metarungia pubinervia (T.Anderson) Baden, indigenous

Monechma 
Genus Monechma:
 Monechma acutum C.B.Clarke, endemic
 Monechma affine Hochst. accepted as Justicia debilis (Forssk.) Vahl 
 Monechma angustifolium Nees, accepted as Justicia bracteata (Hochst.) Zarb, indigenous
 Monechma angustissimum S.Moore, accepted as Justicia divaricata Licht. ex Roem. & Schult. indigenous
 Monechma atherstonei (T.Anderson) C.B.Clarke, accepted as Justicia spartioides T.Anderson, indigenous
 Monechma australe P.G.Mey. accepted as Justicia australis (P.G.Mey.) Vollesen, indigenous
 Monechma bracteatum Hochst. accepted as Justicia bracteata (Hochst.) Zarb, indigenous
 Monechma bracteatum Hochst. var. angustifolium (Nees) C.B.Clarke, accepted as Justicia bracteata (Hochst.) Zarb 
 Monechma clarkei Schinz, accepted as Justicia guerkeana Schinz 
 Monechma crassiusculum P.G.Mey. accepted as Justicia crassiuscula (P.G.Mey.) J.C.Manning & Goldblatt, indigenous
 Monechma debile (Forssk.) Nees, accepted as Justicia debilis (Forssk.) Vahl, indigenous
 Monechma distichotrichum (Lindau) P.G.Mey. accepted as Justicia distichotricha Lindau, indigenous
 Monechma divaricatum (Licht. ex Roem. & Schult.) C.B.Clarke, accepted as Justicia divaricata Licht. ex Roem. & Schult. indigenous
 Monechma eremum S.Moore, accepted as Justicia divaricata Licht. ex Roem. & Schult. 
 Monechma fimbriatum C.B.Clarke, accepted as Justicia divaricata Licht. ex Roem. & Schult. indigenous
 Monechma foliosum C.B.Clarke, endemic
 Monechma genistifolium (Engl.) C.B.Clarke subsp. australe (P.G.Mey.) Munday, accepted as Justicia australis (P.G.Mey.) Vollesen, indigenous
 Monechma incanum (Nees) C.B.Clarke, accepted as Justicia incana (Nees) T.Anderson, indigenous
 Monechma leucoderme (Schinz) C.B.Clarke, accepted as Justicia leucoderme Schinz, indigenous
 Monechma linaria C.B.Clarke, endemic
 Monechma molle C.B.Clarke, accepted as Justicia dregei J.C.Manning & Goldblatt, indigenous
 Monechma mollissimum (Nees) P.G.Mey. accepted as Justicia dregei J.C.Manning & Goldblatt, indigenous
 Monechma monechmoides (S.Moore) Hutch. accepted as Justicia monechmoides S.Moore, indigenous
 Monechma namaense (Schinz) C.B.Clarke, accepted as Justicia divaricata Licht. ex Roem. & Schult. 
 Monechma nepeta (S.Moore) C.B.Clarke, accepted as Justicia divaricata Licht. ex Roem. & Schult. 
 Monechma nepetoides C.B.Clarke, accepted as Justicia divaricata Licht. ex Roem. & Schult. indigenous
 Monechma pseudopatulum C.B.Clarke, accepted as Justicia spartioides T.Anderson, indigenous
 Monechma pseudopatulum C.B.Clarke var. latifolium C.B.Clarke, accepted as Justicia spartioides T.Anderson, indigenous
 Monechma robustum Bond, accepted as Justicia karroica J.C.Manning & Goldblatt, endemic
 Monechma saxatile Munday, accepted as Justicia saxatilis (Munday) J.C.Manning & Goldblatt, endemic
 Monechma spartioides (T.Anderson) C.B.Clarke, accepted as Justicia spartioides T.Anderson, indigenous
 Monechma terminale S.Moore, accepted as Justicia divaricata Licht. ex Roem. & Schult. indigenous

Neuracanthus 
Genus Neuracanthus:
 Neuracanthus africanus T.Anderson ex S.Moore, indigenous
 Neuracanthus africanus T.Anderson ex S.Moore var. limpopoensis Bidgood & Brummitt, accepted as Neuracanthus africanus T.Anderson ex S.Moore, indigenous

Nomaphila 
Genus Nomaphila:
 Nomaphila gracillima Schinz, accepted as Hygrophila gracillima (Schinz) Burkill 
 Nomaphila quadrangularis Klotzsch, accepted as Duosperma quadrangulare (Klotzsch) Brummitt

Odontonema 
Genus Odontonema:
 Odontonema cuspidatum (Nees) Kuntze, not indigenous, cultivated, naturalised, invasive

Peristrophe 
Genus Peristrophe:
 Peristrophe caulopsila E.Mey. ex Nees, accepted as Dicliptera cernua (Hook.f. ex Nees) J.C.Manning & Goldblatt, indigenous
 Peristrophe cernua Hook.f. ex Nees, accepted as Dicliptera cernua (Hook.f. ex Nees) J.C.Manning & Goldblatt, endemic
 Peristrophe cliffordii K.Balkwill, accepted as Dicliptera cliffordii (K.Balkwill) J.C.Manning & Goldblatt, indigenous
 Peristrophe decorticans K.Balkwill, accepted as Dicliptera decorticans (K.Balkwill) I.Darbysh. indigenous
 Peristrophe doriae Terraccino, accepted as Dicliptera paniculata (Forssk.) I.Darbysh. 
 Peristrophe gillilandiorum K.Balkwill, accepted as Dicliptera gillilandiorum (K.Balkwill) I.Darbysh. indigenous
 Peristrophe kotschyana Nees, accepted as Dicliptera paniculata (Forssk.) I.Darbysh. 
 Peristrophe krebsii C.Presl, accepted as Dicliptera cernua (Hook.f. ex Nees) J.C.Manning & Goldblatt, indigenous
 Peristrophe natalensis T.Anderson, accepted as Dicliptera cernua (Hook.f. ex Nees) J.C.Manning & Goldblatt, indigenous
 Peristrophe oblonga Nees, accepted as Dicliptera cernua (Hook.f. ex Nees) J.C.Manning & Goldblatt, indigenous
 Peristrophe paniculata (Forssk.) Brummitt, accepted as Dicliptera paniculata (Forssk.) I.Darbysh. 
 Peristrophe pilosa Turrill, accepted as Dicliptera paniculata (Forssk.) I.Darbysh. 
 Peristrophe transvaalensis (C.B.Clarke) K.Balkwill, accepted as Dicliptera transvaalensis C.B.Clarke, indigenous

Petalidium 
Genus Petalidium:
 Petalidium aromaticum Oberm. indigenous
 Petalidium aromaticum Oberm. var. aromaticum, indigenous
 Petalidium aromaticum Oberm. var. canescens Oberm. indigenous
 Petalidium damarense S.Moore, accepted as Petalidium variabile (Engl.) C.B.Clarke var. variabile 
 Petalidium eenii S.Moore, accepted as Petalidium canescens (Engl.) C.B.Clarke 
 Petalidium eurychlamys Mildbr. accepted as Petalidium englerianum (Schinz) C.B.Clarke 
 Petalidium glutinosum (Engl.) C.B.Clarke, accepted as Petalidium variabile (Engl.) C.B.Clarke var. variabile 
 Petalidium incanum (Engl.) Mildbr. accepted as Petalidium variabile (Engl.) C.B.Clarke var. variabile 
 Petalidium latifolium (Schinz) C.B.Clarke, accepted as Petalidium englerianum (Schinz) C.B.Clarke 
 Petalidium lucens Oberm. indigenous
 Petalidium oblongifolium C.B.Clarke, endemic
 Petalidium ovatum (Schinz) C.B.Clarke, accepted as Petalidium englerianum (Schinz) C.B.Clarke 
 Petalidium parvifolium C.B.Clarke ex Schinz, indigenous
 Petalidium parvifolium C.B.Clarke ex Schinz var. angustifolia Schinz, accepted as Petalidium linifolium T.Anderson 
 Petalidium rubescens Oberm. accepted as Petalidium coccineum S.Moore 
 Petalidium setosum C.B.Clarke ex Schinz, indigenous
 Petalidium wilmaniae Oberm. accepted as Petalidium parvifolium C.B.Clarke ex Schinz

Phaulopsis 
Genus Phaulopsis:
 Phaulopsis imbricata (Forssk.) Sweet, indigenous
 Phaulopsis imbricata (Forssk.) Sweet subsp. imbricata, indigenous
 Phaulopsis longifolia Thomson ex C.B.Clarke, accepted as Phaulopsis imbricata (Forssk.) Sweet subsp. imbricata, present

Pseuderanthemum 
Genus Pseuderanthemum:
 Pseuderanthemum hildebrandtii Lindau, indigenous
 Pseuderanthemum subviscosum (C.B.Clarke) Stapf, indigenous

Pseudobarleria 
Genus Pseudobarleria:
 Pseudobarleria canescens Engl. accepted as Petalidium canescens (Engl.) C.B.Clarke 
 Pseudobarleria coccinea (S.Moore) Lindau, accepted as Petalidium coccineum S.Moore 
 Pseudobarleria engleriana Schinz, accepted as Petalidium englerianum (Schinz) C.B.Clarke 
 Pseudobarleria glandulifera Lindau, accepted as Petalidium rautanenii Schinz 
 Pseudobarleria lanata Engl. accepted as Petalidium lanatum (Engl.) C.B.Clarke 
 Pseudobarleria linifolia (T.Anderson) Lindau, accepted as Petalidium linifolium T.Anderson 
 Pseudobarleria variabilis Engl. accepted as Petalidium variabile (Engl.) C.B.Clarke var. variabile 
 Pseudobarleria variabilis Engl. var. incana Engl. accepted as Petalidium variabile (Engl.) C.B.Clarke var. variabile 
 Pseudobarleria variabilis Engl. var. viridescens Engl. accepted as Petalidium variabile (Engl.) C.B.Clarke var. variabile

Rhaphidospora 
Genus Rhaphidospora:
 Rhaphidospora glabra (J.Konig ex Roxb.) Nees, accepted as Justicia scandens Vahl, indigenous

Rhinacanthus 
Genus Rhinacanthus:
 Rhinacanthus communis C.B.Clarke, accepted as Rhinacanthus gracilis Klotzsch var. gracilis 
 Rhinacanthus gracilis Klotzsch, indigenous
 Rhinacanthus gracilis Klotzsch var. gracilis, indigenous
 Rhinacanthus gracilis Klotzsch var. latilabiatus K.Balkwill, endemic
 Rhinacanthus xerophilus A.Meeuse, indigenous

Rhytiglossa 
Genus Rhytiglossa:
 Rhytiglossa ciliata Nees, accepted as Isoglossa ciliata (Nees) Engl. indigenous
 Rhytiglossa eckloniana Nees, accepted as Isoglossa origanoides (Nees) S.Moore, indigenous
 Rhytiglossa glandulosa Hochst. accepted as Isoglossa woodii C.B.Clarke 
 Rhytiglossa origanoides Nees, accepted as Isoglossa origanoides (Nees) S.Moore, indigenous
 Rhytiglossa ovata Nees, accepted as Isoglossa ovata (Nees) Lindau, indigenous
 Rhytiglossa prolixa Nees, accepted as Isoglossa prolixa (Nees) Lindau, indigenous

Ruellia 
Genus Ruellia:
 Ruellia adhaerens Forssk. accepted as Priva adhaerens (Forssk.) Chiov. indigenous
 Ruellia baurii C.B.Clarke, endemic
 Ruellia ciliaris Pers. accepted as Ruellia cordata Thunb. indigenous
 Ruellia cordata Thunb. indigenous
 Ruellia depressa L. accepted as Dyschoriste depressa (L.) Nees 
 Ruellia depressa L.f. accepted as Dyschoriste depressa (L.) Nees 
 Ruellia gongodes Lindau, accepted as Ruellia patula Jacq. 
 Ruellia imbricata Forssk. accepted as Phaulopsis imbricata (Forssk.) Sweet subsp. imbricata 
 Ruellia malacophylla C.B.Clarke, indigenous
 Ruellia marlothii Engl. accepted as Ruellia diversifolia S.Moore 
 Ruellia mysorensis Roth, accepted as Asystasia mysorensis (Roth) T.Anderson, indigenous
 Ruellia otaviensis P.G.Mey. accepted as Ruellia prostrata Poir. indigenous
 Ruellia ovata Thunb. accepted as Ruellia cordata Thunb. indigenous
 Ruellia ovata Thunb. accepted as Ruellia pilosa L.f. indigenous
 Ruellia patula Jacq. indigenous
 Ruellia pilosa L.f. endemic
 Ruellia prostrata Poir. indigenous
 Ruellia radicans Hochst. ex A.Rich. accepted as Dyschoriste radicans (Hochst. ex A.Rich.) Nees 
 Ruellia setigera Pers. accepted as Dyschoriste setigera (Pers.) J.C.Manning & Goldblatt, indigenous
 Ruellia simplex C.Wright, not indigenous, cultivated, naturalised, invasive
 Ruellia stenophylla C.B.Clarke, indigenous
 Ruellia velutina (Schinz) E.Phillips, accepted as Ruellia diversifolia S.Moore 
 Ruellia woodii C.B.Clarke, endemic
 Ruellia zeyheri (Sond.) T.Anderson, accepted as Ruellia pilosa L.f.

Ruelliopsis 
Genus Ruelliopsis:
 Ruelliopsis setosa (Nees) C.B.Clarke, indigenous

Rungia 
Genus Rungia:
 Rungia pubinervia T.Anderson, accepted as Metarungia pubinervia (T.Anderson) Baden

Ruspolia 
Genus Ruspolia:
 Ruspolia hypocrateriformis (Vahl) Milne-Redh. indigenous
 Ruspolia hypocrateriformis (Vahl) Milne-Redh. var. australis Milne-Redh. indigenous

Ruttya 
Genus Ruttya:
 Ruttya ovata Harv. indigenous

Salpinctium 
Genus Salpinctium:
 Salpinctium natalense (C.B.Clarke) T.J.Edwards, endemic
 Salpinctium stenosiphon (C.B.Clarke) T.J.Edwards, endemic

Sclerochiton 
Genus Sclerochiton:
 Sclerochiton apiculatus Vollesen, indigenous
 Sclerochiton harveyanus Nees, indigenous
 Sclerochiton ilicifolius A.Meeuse, indigenous
 Sclerochiton odoratissimus Hilliard, endemic
 Sclerochiton triacanthus A.Meeuse, endemic

Siphonoglossa 
Genus Siphonoglossa:
 Siphonoglossa leptantha (Nees) Immelman, accepted as Justicia tubulosa (E.Mey. ex Nees) T.Anderson subsp. tubulosa, indigenous
 Siphonoglossa leptantha (Nees) Immelman subsp. late-ovata (C.B.Clarke) Immelman, accepted as Justicia tubulosa (E.Mey. ex Nees) T.Anderson subsp. late-ovata (C.B.Clarke) J.C.Manning & Goldblatt, endemic
 Siphonoglossa linifolia (Lindau) C.B.Clarke, accepted as Justicia linifolia (Lindau) V.A.W.Graham, indigenous
 Siphonoglossa nkandlaensis Immelman, accepted as Justicia nkandlaensis (Immelman) J.C.Manning & Goldblatt, endemic

Synnema 
Genus Synnema:
 Synnema acinos S.Moore, accepted as Hygrophila acinos (S.Moore) Heine 
 Synnema angolense S.Moore, accepted as Hygrophila angolensis (S.Moore) Heine

Thunbergia 
Genus Thunbergia:
 Thunbergia alata Bojer ex Sims, indigenous
 Thunbergia amoena C.B.Clarke, endemic
 Thunbergia aspera Nees, accepted as Thunbergia atriplicifolia E.Mey. ex Nees 
 Thunbergia atriplicifolia E.Mey. ex Nees, indigenous
 Thunbergia aurea N.E.Br. indigenous
 Thunbergia bachmannii Lindau, accepted as Thunbergia atriplicifolia E.Mey. ex Nees 
 Thunbergia capensis Retz. endemic
 Thunbergia cordibracteolata C.B.Clarke, accepted as Thunbergia atriplicifolia E.Mey. ex Nees 
 Thunbergia dregeana Nees, indigenous
 Thunbergia galpinii Lindau, accepted as Thunbergia atriplicifolia E.Mey. ex Nees 
 Thunbergia grandiflora (Roxb. ex Rottler) Roxb. not indigenous, cultivated, naturalised, invasive
 Thunbergia hirtistyla C.B.Clarke, accepted as Thunbergia atriplicifolia E.Mey. ex Nees 
 Thunbergia natalensis Hook. indigenous
 Thunbergia neglecta Sond. indigenous
 Thunbergia pondoensis Lindau, indigenous
 Thunbergia purpurata Harv. ex C.B.Clarke, endemic
 Thunbergia venosa C.B.Clarke, endemic
 Thunbergia xanthotricha Lindau, accepted as Thunbergia atriplicifolia E.Mey. ex Nees

References

South African plant biodiversity lists
Acanthaceae